is the latest title in a Japanese video game series  (turn-based sandbox role-playing video games/turn-based strategy) produced by Koei. It was released on PC and PlayStation 2 in 2004 followed by PlayStation Portable in 2009. The first title of the series was released on NEC PC-9801 in 1992 followed by Super Famicom and Genesis/Mega Drive. It was later re-released on the Wii Virtual Console on September 1, 2009, adapted from the Super Famicom version.

The name of the game roughly means "the Taikō's success story". The characters are taken from the Momoyama period in Japan. In the previous Taikō Risshiden IV, players could select a samurai, a ninja or a merchant as their character. In Taikō Risshiden V, new roles include a blademaster, a pirate, a doctor, a tea master, and a blacksmith, counting eight roles in total. The player meets various historical figures of the era in the game.

Summary

The game follows the card system used in Taikō Risshiden IV, with new professions added. A number of playable warlords are expanded for each version to 800 for Windows and 860 for the PlayStation 2. Non-combat characters include foreign missionaries, monks, and wives of the military lords. There are four overseas bases that pirates and merchants can travel to: Naha (Ryukyu, now part of Japan), Busan (Korea), Ningbo (Ming China), and Luzon (in the Philippines).

The military commander graphics were changed from the manga style of version III and IV to a graphic novel, or gekiga style, adopted from the format employed in a title named Nobunaga's Ambition. While each of the internal affairs and training sessions were presented in mini-games in Taikō Risshiden IV unless you change options in PlayStation 2 edition or later, in this version it is possible to opt out and skip those mini-games. However, when the player skips those mini-games, technical points will not be gained on ability score, and there are events that the player is challenged with the mini-games, even when opted to skip them. Like the previous PlayStation 2 version, players on Windows will gain new modes according to the number of cards gained during the play. The function to edit warlord data is employed when all docks are collected, to replace the Power Up Kit used in other Koei titles.

When creating a special commander or warrior, the player designs the appearance. For instance, the player chooses and arranges facial features, props, and clothing that are not available to choose from among preset outlooks. It is in this version that a female warlord can be chosen for the first time, as well as the player being able to register and maneuver up to 40 characters along with the main warlord at the same time.

Track listing

List of games
Taiko Risshiden – PC , Genesis 
Taiko Risshiden II – PlayStation , PC
Taiko Risshiden III – PC , PlayStation 
Taiko Risshiden IV – PC , PlayStation Portable 
Taiko Risshiden V – PC , PlayStation Portable

References

External links
 

Koei games
Koei Tecmo franchises
Sega Genesis games
Super Nintendo Entertainment System games
Video game franchises
Video games about samurai
Video games set in feudal Japan
Video games developed in Japan
Virtual Console games
Virtual Console games for Wii U
Japan-exclusive video games
NEC PC-9801 games
Video games scored by Michiru Ōshima